Two ships have been named Isle of Inishmore:

 , in service under this name 1993–1996
 , in service under this name from 1996

Ship names